Homeyl District is a district (bakhsh) in Eslamabad-e Gharb County, Kermanshah Province, Iran. At the 2006 census, its population was 19,873, in 4,482 families.  The District has one city: Homeyl. The District has three rural districts (dehestan): Harasam Rural District, Homeyl Rural District, and Mansuri Rural District.

References 

Eslamabad-e Gharb County
Districts of Kermanshah Province